Za Za Bazaar World Banquet & Bar is a buffet restaurant in Bristol, England.

The restaurant, in Bristol's Harbourside area, opened just before Christmas in 2011. Its construction lasted thirteen weeks, and cost £3 million. It was billed as the largest restaurant in the United Kingdom, and seats 1,000 people, eclipsing Croydon's Cosmo restaurant in size, which seats 800.

It was established with the plan to open another seven "super restaurants" across the United Kingdom, in an investment of £10m, that was rumoured to create 1,000 jobs in eighteen months. However, the expansion did not materialise, and a planned restaurant in Norwich has yet to be built. The food is split into the main categories of Far East, Tex Mex, European and Indian.

A second restaurant, situated in Newcastle City Centre, permanently closed in 2020 as a result of the COVID-19 pandemic.

References

External links 
 Za Za Bazaar on Twitter

Restaurants established in 2011
Buffet restaurants
Restaurants in Bristol
2011 establishments in England